Mother Love Bone (also known as Stardog Champion) is a compilation album by the American rock band Mother Love Bone. It was released on September 22, 1992, through Stardog/Mercury Records.

Overview 
The album contains material from the EP Shine (1989) and the album Apple (1990). It was released by PolyGram subsidiary Stardog/Mercury Records after the band dissolved due to the death of vocalist Andrew Wood. The album charted at number 77 on the Billboard 200 album chart in 1992. Ira Robbins of Entertainment Weekly said, "Mother Love Bone—the band's total output—suggests a young, hungry Aerosmith hooked on Led Zeppelin."

Song meanings 
On Thursday, March 15, 1990 (just 26 hours before Andy Wood's overdose), RIP writer Michael Browning and Andrew Wood conducted what might be his last interview. Mother Love Bone were scheduled to be a part of a RIP magazine-sponsored three-band tour supporting Apple, which was ready to be released. He describes the many of the song meanings:Andy Wood: "Stardog Champion" is a kinda...fake, kinda patriotic rock anthem of sorts. That's gonna be the first single and video. When I wrote "Holy Roller," I didn't even know what a holy roller was. I just thought it was a cool term. Actually, I was thinking of a Paul McCartney and Wings song "Let Me Roll It." I don't know why it made me think of holy rollers. "Captain High-Top" is just a total rock propaganda kinda thing. I kinda see "Heartshine" as our "Achilles' Last Stand" of the album. It's long and real powerful. I was kinda depressed about leaving Malfunkshun for a long time. Still am, kinda. I feel like, you know, I left them stranded. I've got a brother besides Kevin who, ah, is kinda insane in a way, and he makes the whole family worry about him, so "Heartshine" is a little about both of my brothers.RIP: "Mr. Danny Boy" is obviously a slam on Danny Thomas.A.W.: Yeah, I don't know why we decided to do such a mean thing to Danny.RIP: But you did.A.W.: That's right. No offense to Marlo. I still like her from ThatGirl[laughs].RIP: "Come Bite the Apple," is there any significance to that?A.W.: That's a meaningful song. It's a "Crown of Thorns" type of song. The lyrics are personal, whereas some of the songs have absolutely nothing to do with me. "Apple" and "Crown of Thorns" are probably mostly about me. It's kind of a synopsis of the whole past year. I'm lucky to be sitting here.

Commercial performance
The album debuted at No. 77 on the Billboard 200 for chart dated October 10, 1992, selling 14,000 copies in the first week.  The album has sold 410,000 copies in the United States as of September 2016.

Track listing 
All songs written by Jeff Ament, Bruce Fairweather, Greg Gilmore, Stone Gossard, and Andrew Wood.

Recorded for Apple:

Recorded for Shine:

Bonus disc

Personnel 

Mother Love Bone
 Andrew Wood – lead vocals, piano
 Bruce Fairweather – lead guitar
 Stone Gossard – rhythm guitar
 Jeff Ament – bass
 Greg Gilmore – drums

Production
 Michael Bays – art direction
 James Bland – inside photos
 Greg Calbi, Bob Ludwig – mastering
 Bruce Calder – production on "Stargazer"
 Terry Date, Mother Love Bone – production
 Mark Dearnley – production, mixing
 Tim Palmer – mixing

Chart positions

References 

1992 compilation albums
Albums produced by Terry Date
Mother Love Bone albums
Compilation albums published posthumously
Grunge compilation albums
Mercury Records compilation albums
Albums produced by Jeff Ament
Albums produced by Stone Gossard